Northern Wind, is a 2017 Franco–Belgian–Tunisian family drama film directed by Walid Mattar and co-produced by Saïd Hamich and Anthony Rey. The film stars Philippe Rebbot with Mohamed Amine Hamzaoui, Kacey Mottet Klein, Corinne Masiero, and Abir Bennani in supporting roles. The film tells the story of Herve who moves Tunisia after his company in France was relocated, but faces lots of struggle.

The film was shot in France and Tunisia. It premiered on 14 December 2017 in France. The film received mixed reviews from critics. In 2017 at the Carthage Film Festival, the film was nominated for the Tanit d'Or for the Best Narrative Feature Film.

Cast
 Philippe Rebbot as Hervé Lepoutre
 Mohamed Amine Hamzaoui as Foued Benslimane
 Kacey Mottet Klein as Vincent Lepoutre
 Corinne Masiero as Véronique Lepoutre
 Abir Bennani as Karima
 Khaled Brahmi as Chiheb
 Thierry Hancisse as Bernard
 Nissaf Ben Hafsia as Zina Ben Slimane
 Marianne Garcia as Femme du vestiaire
 François Godart as Patrick Lefevre

References

External links 
 

Tunisian drama films
2017 films
2017 drama films
Belgian drama films
French drama films
2010s French films